Percy Thorpe (18 July 1899 – 1972) was an English footballer who played at right-back for Sutton Town, Blackpool, Connah's Quay & Shotton, Reading, Sheffield United, West Ham United, Accrington Stanley, and Port Vale.

Career
Thorpe signed for Frank Buckley's Blackpool prior to the start of the 1924–25 season after leaving non-league Sutton Town. He made his debut for the club in the opening League game, a single-goal victory at Clapton Orient on 30 August. He went on to make a further eleven league appearances that campaign, the majority of which were spent at centre-half; however, he did play up front alongside the prolific Harry Bedford for one game, in the absence of Matt Barrass.

In 1925–26, Thorpe made thirty Second Division appearances and scored three goals. He spent the majority of that campaign at right full-back, but also switched to the left side briefly. He scored his first goal for Blackpool in a 3–2 Boxing Day victory over Chelsea at Bloomfield Road. It came from the penalty spot, as did his other two goals. Thorpe appeared in 38 of Blackpool's 42 league games of 1926–27. He scored two goals – one a penalty, the other from open play. Sydney Beaumont succeeded Frank Buckley as manager for the 1927–28 campaign, and Beaumont gave 33 starts to Thorpe, in what was his final season with the club. His final appearance for Blackpool occurred in the final game of the season, a 4–0 home victory over Fulham on 5 May.

After leaving Blackpool, Thorpe joined Connah's Quay & Shotton, before returning to the Second Division with Reading. He joined Sheffield United in 1930. The "Blades" finished 15th in the First Division in 1930–31, seventh in 1931–32, and tenth in 1932–33. In three years at Bramall Lane, he scored 24 goals in 114 league and cup competitions.

He later had brief spells with West Ham United and Accrington Stanley, before he finished his career at Port Vale. He signed as a 35-year-old in November 1934 and made his final footballing appearance on 19 November at The Old Recreation Ground in a goalless draw against the club with which he made his name – Blackpool. He retired at the end of the 1934–35 season.

Career statistics
Source:

References
General
 
 

Specific

1899 births
1972 deaths
Footballers from Nottingham
English footballers
Association football fullbacks
Sutton Town A.F.C. players
Blackpool F.C. players
Connah's Quay & Shotton F.C. players
Reading F.C. players
Sheffield United F.C. players
West Ham United F.C. players
Accrington Stanley F.C. (1891) players
Port Vale F.C. players
English Football League players